Tujeon (literally fighting tablets) are the traditional playing cards of Korea used in the latter half of the Joseon dynasty. They are also known as tupae (literally fighting cards).

Composition
A deck typically contains forty, sixty or eighty cards: nine numeral cards, and one General (jang), to each suit. In a full eight-suited deck, the suits and their generals are as follows:
Man led by the King
Fish led by the Dragon
Crow led by the Phoenix
Pheasant led by the Falcon
Roe deer led by the Tiger
Star led by the North Star
Rabbit led by the Eagle
Horse led by the Wagon

Yu Deuk-gong (1749–1807) wrote in his Seoul Miscellany that in the suits of stars, horses, roe deer, and rabbits; the ranking of the numeral cards are in inverted order with nine being the lowest rank and one being the second highest, outranked only by the general. This ranking can also be seen in archaic games such as Ganjifa, Madiao, Triomphe, and Unsun Karuta.

They are made of oiled paper or leather. The backs are usually decorated with a stylized feather design.

History

In his 1895 book Korean Games, with notes on the corresponding games of China and Japan, ethnographer Stewart Culin suggested that tujeon originated from the similarly shaped symbolic bamboo "arrows" used for divination in sixth-century Korea. This hypothesis, however, is supported mainly by visual similarity and remains unsubstantiated.

Seong Daejung (1732-1809) claimed that Jang Hyeon (b. 1613) brought the Chinese card game of Madiao back to Korea. Seong also claimed Jang simplified the cards to create tujeon while in prison and taught the game to prisoners and guards. Jang himself is believed to have died in prison. King Jeongjo (r. 1776-1800) issued several ineffective bans against tujeon after gambling was causing serious social problems.

By the early 19th century, tujeon evolved somewhat from its original form: decks were typically only forty to sixty cards in size, using four or six of the eight suits; and the numeral cards were no longer marked to distinguish their suit, being used interchangeably. Only the generals kept their suits. The cards were replaced by hanafuda during the Japanese occupation but some tujeon rules were transferred over to the Japanese cards.

Games

By far the most popular game was gabo japgi, so much so that the name was used interchangeably with tujeon. Also known as yeot bang mangyi (엿방망이, "sweetmeat pestle"), it is a baccarat-like game similar to the Chinese domino game kol-ye-si (골여시). It is played with the 60 card deck and the object is to reach gabo or kapo which is gambling slang for 9. The game seems to be derived from Kabufuda games where the goal is to reach kabu or kaho which is also slang for 9. Both kabu and kapo are possibly descended from the Portuguese cavo which was slang for a stake or wager. Another similar game is Komi, played with Ganjapa cards, from Odisha, India along Portugal's old trade routes. Baccarat did not appear in Europe until mid-19th century France and was preceded by a simpler game called Macao, further hinting at a Portuguese connection. The rules for all these games are likely derivative of the 16th century Ming game of Sanzhang (三長) which was originally played with Madiao cards but modern players prefer using the French deck.

Another popular game was dong dang (동당), an early rummy game similar to Khanhoo.

In popular culture
Playing the Tujeon cards is a theme used in several period drama series. Among them:
 The fight between Kim Gong-ryang and Prince Gwanghae in Ep. 08 of The King's Face.

References

Playing cards
Korean games
History of card decks
Korean card games